Marvin Eugene Cook (born February 24, 1966) is an American former professional football player who was a tight end in the National Football League (NFL). He was selected by the New England Patriots in the third round of the 1989 NFL Draft. A 6'4", 234-lb. tight end from the University of Iowa, Cook played in seven NFL seasons from 1989 to 1995 for the Patriots, the Chicago Bears, and the St. Louis Rams. He was a two-time Pro Bowl selection in 1991 and 1992.

In 1991, Cook was fourth in NFL receptions with 83. His 210 receptions as a Patriot put him 3rd in team history for tight ends behind Rob Gronkowski and Ben Coates.

Coaching
From 2007 to 2021, Cook was the head football coach at Regina High School in Iowa City, where he won seven straight state titles between 2010 and 2016, as well as a state record 56 game winning streak from 2010 to 2013.

In 2010, one of Regina's 14 wins was against Class 3A's #1 Ranked team, the Solon Spartans, of the WaMaC Conference, ending Solon's 44 game winning streak.

Regina is the conference rival of Cook's own high school, in West Branch, where his football jersey is retired and in the halls at West Branch High School.

Cook announced in May 2021 that he would be resigning as Regina's head coach, his youngest son having graduated from Regina earlier that month. Cook did not specify future plans.

References

1966 births
Living people
American football tight ends
Chicago Bears players
Iowa Hawkeyes football players
New England Patriots players
St. Louis Rams players
High school football coaches in Iowa
All-American college football players
American Conference Pro Bowl players
Sportspeople from Iowa City, Iowa
People from West Branch, Iowa
Players of American football from Iowa